"Face 2 Face" is a song by American rapper and singer Juice Wrld. It was released as a single on December 15, 2022, by Grade A Productions and Interscope Records. The song was produced by Charlie Handsome, Rex Kudo, and Joe Reeves.

Background 

"Face 2 Face" was first previewed on December 8, 2022, at the second annual Juice Wrld Day event, with the song's release date being announced on the same day. The song's cover art was designed by Majinboof and revealed on December 13; Majinboof is also known for designing the cover art for Juice Wrld's first studio album, Goodbye & Good Riddance, and the singles "All Girls Are the Same", "Lucid Dreams", "Wasted", and "In My Head".

Composition 

Over an acoustic guitar-heavy production, Juice Wrld sings about his struggles with sleep paralysis. The song opens with Juice Wrld describing what an episode of the condition is typically like for him, saying that his mind becomes a "bloody scene" as "evil" begins to grab hold and he "[detaches] from reality". Following the opening chorus, the song features only a single verse, in which Juice Wrld sings that he feels as if his artistic abilities are a curse, akin to Midas' golden touch. In the second half of the verse, he likens himself to a sinking ship while also making references to "monsters", like "the Devil", that haunt his dreams and seek to "bring [him] down".

Music video 
The official music video was directed by Steve Cannon and released on December 15, 2022. It follows a young woman as she spends the night alone and experiences an episode of sleep paralysis. Matching the lyrics of the song, the woman's experience is very similar to Juice Wrld's, with multiple evil spirits and a creature resembling the Devil appearing in her room and towering over her as she lays paralyzed in fear; the video ends with the woman waking up from the episode in shock, before the definition of sleep paralysis is displayed on screen.

Charts

References 

2022 singles
2022 songs
Juice Wrld songs
Songs written by Juice Wrld
Interscope Records singles